Upper Warrego is a rural locality in the Shire of Murweh, Queensland, Australia. In the  Upper Warrego had a population of 0 people.

Geography 
Upper Warrego has the following mountains:

 Bally Lethbridge 
 Bullock Mountain 
 Junction Hill 
 Mount Black 
 Mount Drummond 
 Mount Emily 
 Mount Grassy 
 Mount Hopeless 
 Mount King 
 Mount Lambert 
 Mount Lyon 
 Mount Sugarloaf 
 Mount Tabor 
 Mount Yanalah

History 
The locality takes its name from the Warrego River, where Warrego is the Aboriginal name for the river, according to notes made on 11 September 1846 by Thomas Mitchell, the Surveyor-General of New South Wales.

In the  Upper Warrego had a population of 0 people.

Road infrastructure
The Landsborough Highway passes to the west.

References

Shire of Murweh
Localities in Queensland